The following is the qualification system and qualified athletes for the Badminton at the 2019 Pan American Games competitions.

Qualification system
A total of 88 athletes (44 men and 44 women) will qualify to compete at the games. A nation may enter a maximum of four athletes per gender. As host nation, Peru automatically qualifies a full team of eights athletes. All other quotas were awarded through the team world rankings as of February 28, 2019. Each nation's highest ranked athlete/pair's points in each of the five events were added to determine a country's point total. The top three ranked will qualify eight athletes, the next four countries will qualify six each (three per gender) and the next four after that will qualify four each (two per gender). All other nations will qualify two athletes each (one per gender).

Qualification summary 
A total of 22 nations qualified athletes.

Qualification standings

Suriname declined two female quotas and these were reallocated to Bolivia and Colombia.
Trinidad and Tobago declined one male quota, which was redistributed to Guatemala.

References

2018 in badminton
2019 in badminton
Badminton at the 2019 Pan American Games